Rudra Pratap Singh may refer to:

R. P. Singh, cricketer born in 1985
R. P. Singh (cricketer, born 1965)
 Rudra Pratap Singh (politician)
Rudra Pratap Singh, the first raja of Orchha State who died in 1531 CE